Wokou (Japanese: Wakō; Korean: 왜구 Waegu), which literally translates to "Japanese pirates", were pirates who raided the coastlines of China and Korea from the 13th century to the 16th century. The wokou came from Japanese, Korean, and Chinese ethnicities which varied over time and raided the mainland from islands in the Sea of Japan and East China Sea. Wokou activity in Korea declined after the Treaty of Gyehae in 1443, but continued in Ming China and peaked during the Jiajing wokou raids in the mid-1500s, but Chinese reprisals and strong clamp downs on pirates by Japanese authorities saw the wokou virtually disappear by the 1600s.

History 
There are two distinct eras of wokou piracy. The early wokou mostly set up camp on the outlying islands of the Japanese archipelago in the Sea of Japan, as opposed to the 16th century wokou who were mostly non-Japanese. The early wokou raided the Japanese themselves as well as China and Korea.

The first recorded use of the term wokou (倭寇) is on the Gwanggaeto Stele, a stone monument erected in modern Ji'an, Jilin, China, to celebrate the exploits of Gwanggaeto the Great of Goguryeo (r. 391–413). The stele states that "wokou" ("Japanese robbers") crossed the sea and were defeated by him in the year 404. The term wokou is a combination of the Chinese terms Wō (倭), referring to either dwarfs or pejoratively to the Japanese, and kòu "bandit".

Early wokou

The origin of the term wokou dates back to the 4th century, but among wokou's activities which are divided into two academic periods, the pirates called "early wokou" were born from the Mongol invasion of Japan. As a result of the war, the coastal defense capabilities of China and Korea were significantly reduced. Also, as a result of the war, people living in Tsushima, Iki, and Gotō Islands in Kyushu suffered extreme poverty. For these reasons, wokou gradually intensified their looting on the coasts of China and Korea. Jeong Mong-ju was dispatched to Japan to deal with the problem, and during his visit Kyushu governor Imagawa Sadayo suppressed the early wokou, later returning their captured property and people to Korea. In 1405 Ashikaga Yoshimitsu sent twenty captured pirates to China, where they were boiled in a cauldron in Ningbo.

According to Korean records, wako pirates were particularly rampant roughly from 1350. After almost annual invasions of the southern provinces of Jeolla and Gyeongsang, they migrated northwards to the Chungcheong and Gyeonggi areas. The History of Goryeo has a record of sea battles in 1380 whereby one hundred warships were sent to Jinpo to rout Japanese pirates there, releasing 334 captives, Japanese sorties decreasing then after. The wako pirates were effectively expelled through the use of gunpowder technology, which the wako then lacked, after Goryeo founded the Office of Gunpowder Weapons in 1377 (but abolished twelve years later).

In 1419, the Korean army landed in Tsushima and started the Ōei Invasion, the largest operation against wokou ever. General Yi Jongmu's fleet of 227 ships and 17,285 soldiers set off from Geoje Island toward Tsushima on June 19, 1419. According to "Veritable Records of the Joseon Dynasty" a Korean history book, in the battle of June 20, the Korean army captured 129 wokou ships, burned 1939 houses, killed 114 people, captured 21 people, and rescued 131 Chinese who were captured by the wokou. On June 29, they burned 15 wokou ships and 68 houses, killed nine people, and rescued 15 people, including Chinese and Koreans, who had been held captive, but more than a hundred soldiers were killed by wokou. On July 3, the Korean army withdrew to Geoje Island, and finally withdrew completely after giving up the re-landing and occupation of Tsushima due to the loss of Korean army and worsening weather. In the record of July 10, the number of soldiers killed by wokou was rectified to 180. On the other hand, according to historical documents recorded by the Sō clan, the death toll of the Korean army was 2500.

When the Treaty of Gyehae was concluded between the Joseon and Sō Sadamori of Tsushima in 1443 and Sō clan was given trade privileges, wokou's activities along the Korean Peninsula calmed down.

Some of the coastal forts built for defense against wokou can still be found in Zhejiang and Fujian. Among them are the well-restored Pucheng Fortress (in Cangnan County, Zhejiang) and Chongwu Fortress (in Chongwu, Huai'an County, Fujian), as well as the ruins of the Liu'ao Fortress in Liu'ao, Zhangpu County (Fujian).

Later wokou

According to the History of Ming, 30% of the 16th century wokou were Japanese and 70% were ethnic Chinese.

In attempts to centralize political control, the Ming Dynasty enacted trade bans with the consensus being that "unrestricted trade would lead to chaos". With maritime trade outlawed, China's navy was reduced and, as a result, they were unable to combat increased smuggling which led to wokou control over the southeastern coast. Although wokou means "Japanese pirates", major wokou groups in the 16th century were led by Chinese traders whose livelihoods were halted by the Ming trade bans. Because of the extent of corruption in the Ming court, many Chinese officials actually had relations with the pirates and benefited from the piracy, making it difficult for central authorities to control.

Two well known Chinese military figures involved in the combating of wokou were Qi Jiguang and Yu Dayou. Yu Dayou was a general of the Ming dynasty who was assigned to defend the coast against the Japanese pirates. In 1553, a young man named Qi Jiguang became Assistant Regional Military Commissioner of the Ming dynasty and was assigned to "punish the bandits and guard the people" which meant taking on the Japanese pirates attacking the Ming east coast. At that time, he was only twenty-six years old. On the eve of the next year he was promoted to full Commissioner in Zhejiang because of his successes.

The wokou even made it into the Philippines before their extermination in the 1600s. Aparri, in northern Luzon, Philippines was established as a pirate city-state under the patronage of the wokou. The area around Aparri was the site of the 1582 Cagayan battles between Japanese pirates and Spanish soldiers. The wokou were not only limited to Aparri. The pirate-warlord Limahong attempted and failed to invade Manila and afterwards set up a temporary pirate state in Caboloan (Pangasinan) before he was expelled by the Spanish.

Controversy over identity 

The identity of the wokou is subject to some debate, with various theories about the ethnic makeup and national origin of the pirates.

Professor Takeo Tanaka of University of Tokyo proposed in 1966 that the early wokou were Koreans living on these outlying islands. In the Annals of the Joseon Dynasty, the compiled section for King Sejong relates that a vassal named Yi Sun-mong (1386–1449) told his monarch "I hear that in the late Goryeo kingdom period, wokou roaming (our country) and the peasants could not withstand them. However only 1 or 2 (out of 10) were caused by (real) Japanese. Some of our peasants imitatively wore Japanese clothing, formed a group and caused trouble... in order to stop all evils, there is nothing more urgent than the Hopae (personal identification system)". However, Yi did not live during the Goryeo dynasty, and was likely relating rumor or legend as opposed to solid documented evidence. Moreover, the thrust of Yi's speech concentrates on how national security was deteriorating and how it required special attention; it is possible he made use of unreliable information to support his point. Yi's assertion is therefore not highly valued as a source for wokou by other researchers. The chronicle Goryeosa records 529 wokou raids during the 1223–1392 period, but mentions the "fake Japanese" only 3 times.

The current prevailing theory is that of Shōsuke Murai, who demonstrated in 1988 that the early wokou came from multiple ethnic groups rather than one singular nation. Murai wrote that the wokou were "marginal men" living in politically unstable areas without national allegiances, akin to the Zomia thesis. Supporters of this theory point out that one of the early wokou leaders, Ajibaldo, was variously claimed by period sources to be Mongolian, Japanese, Korean, and an "islander";<ref>{{cite book |last1=Tōgō |first1=Takashi |last2=Ueda |first2=Shin, illustr. |title=Etoki zōhyō ashigaru tachi no tatakai |publisher=Kodansha |year=2007 |pages=48–51 |quote= |language=ja}}</ref> his name is apparently Korean and Mongolian in origin.

See also
Gihae Eastern Expedition, a 1419 Joseon invasion of wokou bases
God of War (film)
Limahong
Lin Daoqian
Piracy in the Strait of Malacca
Wang Zhi (pirate)Tochak WaeguNotes

References
Primary sources:
Hŭi-gyŏng Song, Shōsuke Murai. Rōshōdō Nihon kōroku : Chōsen shisetsu no mita chūsei Nihon (老松堂日本行錄 : 朝鮮使節の見た中世日本) Iwanami Shoten, Tōkyō, 1987. 
Zheng Ruohui, Zhouhai Tubian (籌海図編)

Secondary sources:

Boxer, C.R. "Piracy in the South China Sea", History Today, XXX, 12 (December), pp. 40–44.
 (Includes an English translation of Galeote Pereira's report and Gaspar da Cruz' book, with C.R. Boxer's comments)

So, Kwan-wai. Japanese Piracy in Ming China During the sixteenth Century''. Michigan State University Press, East Lansing, 1975. 
Turnbull, Stephen "Samurai: The World of the Warrior" Osprey Publishing, Oxford, 2003, pp. 155–57. 
Mann, C. C. (2011). 1493: Uncovering the new world Columbus created. Vintage.161-163

External links
"Tribute and Trade", KoreanHistoryProject.org

Piracy in the Pacific Ocean
Piracy in China
Anti-Japanese sentiment in China
Anti-Japanese sentiment in Korea
Japanese pirates
Ming dynasty
Naval history of China
Warfare of the Middle Ages
Medieval pirates
Military history of Korea